Charles Soreng, born the 18 August 1934 in Jharkhand (India) and died the 11 January 2019 in Ranchi (India) was a Jesuit Indian priest, educationist and director of the Ranchi seminary. Appointed bishop of Daltonganj in 1989 he was transferred to the new diocese of Hazaribag in 1995.

Life 
Soreng was born in India and was ordained to the Catholic priesthood in 1969. He served as bishop of the Roman Catholic Diocese of Daltonganj, India from 1989 to 1995 and as bishop of the Roman Catholic Diocese of Hazaribag, India, from 1995 to 2012.

Notes

External links

1934 births
2019 deaths
20th-century Indian Jesuits
21st-century Roman Catholic bishops in India
20th-century Roman Catholic bishops in India
21st-century Indian Jesuits
Jesuit bishops